Tracadie-Hillsborough Park is a former provincial electoral district for the Legislative Assembly of Prince Edward Island, Canada.

The district was created in the redistribution that preceded the 2007 Prince Edward Island general election out of parts of Sherwood-Hillsborough, Stanhope-East Royalty and Tracadie-Fort Augustus.

The district was dissolved in the redistribution that preceded the 2019 Prince Edward Island general election. Its urban portion in Charlottetown was transferred to the new district of Charlottetown-Hillsborough Park, while the rural portion was largely transferred to the district of Stanhope-Marshfield, and a small part transferred to Morell-Donagh.

Members
The riding has elected the following Members of the Legislative Assembly:

Election results

2016 electoral reform plebiscite results

References

 Tracadie-Hillsborough Park information

Former provincial electoral districts of Prince Edward Island